Lightstorm may refer to:
 Lightstorm, a 1998 science fiction book by Peter F. Hamilton, part of The Web
 Lightstorm Entertainment, an American film production company